The Monell Chemical Senses Center is a non-profit independent scientific institute located at the University City Science Center campus in Philadelphia, in Pennsylvania. Monell conducts and publishes interdisciplinary basic research on taste, smell, and chemesthesis (chemically mediated skin senses, such as the burn of capsaicin or the tingle of carbonation).

Overview
Monell was founded in 1968. The center's mission is to advance knowledge of the mechanisms and functions of the chemical senses. Knowledge gained from Monell’s  research is relevant to issues related to public health, national health policy, and quality of life, including studies of obesity, diabetes, hypertension, pediatric health, occupational safety, environmental interactions, and national defense.

Monell has a staff of more than 50 scientists and provides research opportunities for local high school and undergraduate students. Monell is operated as a non-profit organization and receives funding from government grants, primarily from the National Institutes of Health through the National Institute on Deafness and Other Communication Disorders and the National Institute of Diabetes and Digestive and Kidney Diseases, as well as from private foundations and unrestricted corporate gifts.

Research

Selected achievements

 Characterized the first sweet-tasting protein, “Monellin,” broadening the concept of sweet taste
 Demonstrated that body odors can signal disease even before appearance of overt symptoms
 Revealed critical role of perinatal experience in establishing flavor preferences of infants, children, and adults
 Described role of liver chemosensors in control of appetite and satiety.
 Established that genetically-determined odortypes provide signals of individual identity. 
 Developed the labeled magnitude scale to reliably measure human sensory perception.
 Pioneered use of living human tissue to characterize human olfactory and taste cell function. 
 Identified  the Sac locus coding for the TAS1R3 receptor, one of the receptors for the sweet taste.
 Established use of chemosignals as effective nonlethal means of vertebrate pest control.
 Demonstrated the role of diet in adult preference for salty taste.
 Combined sensory and genetic approaches to document unique sensory worlds for every individual.
 Used sensory properties of olive oil to identify oleocanthal, a novel anti-inflammatory compound.

Social decisions and olfactory cues in children
In  2016, Monell announced that it had completed research that found toddlers use sensory information to make social decisions. The study included 140 children between the ages of three and eleven years old. Each child was exposed for three seconds to odors from fish, rose, or a placebo. The children were then immediately shown pictures of the same person with a disgusted face and a happy face and asked to choose one.

The children then were asked about how pleasant the odor was. Children five and under generally chose the happy face regardless of the odor they were presented with. Starting around age five, children generally selected faces based on the pleasantness of the odor. For example, being exposed to the fish odor boosted their likelihood of choosing the disgusted face.

Food
In 2019, Monell published a paper in the journal Physiology & Behavior that included an analysis of about 400,000 food reviews posted on Amazon. Monell scientists concluded that most common complaint about food items is that they were too sweet. They also found that saltiness was almost never mentioned. The researchers suggested that differences in the perception of food tastes were due to genetics. They used "big data" methods to conduct their analysis of the reviews.

Publications 
Monell publishes a quarterly electronic newsletter dedicated to news about the center's activities and the latest information on relevant science.

Notable members
 Alexander Bachmanov
 Gary Beauchamp
 Paul Breslin
 Pamela Dalton
 Alan Gelperin
 Robert Margolskee
 Julie Mennella
 George Preti
 Danielle Reed
 Michael Tordoff
 Henry G. Walter Jr.
 Charles Wysocki
 Kunio Yamazaki

References

External links
 

Research institutes in Pennsylvania
Independent research institutes
Neuroscience research centers in the United States
Gustation
Olfaction
Companies based in Philadelphia
Buildings and structures in Philadelphia
University City, Philadelphia